Clermont-d'Excideuil (literally Clermont of Excideuil) is a commune in the Dordogne department in Nouvelle-Aquitaine in southwestern France.

Population

History
Until the end of the 18th century, there was a number of megaliths in Clermont, aligned like those in Carnac. They stood between the hamlets La Valade to the north and Le Verdier to the south. The name of the locality Pierres Brunes is a reminder of the megaliths. They were exploited by blacksmiths, and nothing of them remains.  Several modern historians place them on a great ancient commercial route between Vannes in Armorica and Marseille on the Mediterranean Sea via Mende.

See also
Communes of the Dordogne department

References

Communes of Dordogne
Arrondissement of Périgueux